The cinnamon-crested spadebill (Platyrinchus saturatus) is a species of bird in the family Tyrannidae.
It is found in Brazil, Colombia, Ecuador, French Guiana, Guyana, Peru, Suriname, and Venezuela.

Its natural habitat is subtropical or tropical moist lowland forests.

References

cinnamon-crested spadebill
Birds of the Amazon Basin
Birds of the Guianas
cinnamon-crested spadebill
cinnamon-crested spadebill
cinnamon-crested spadebill
Birds of Brazil
Taxonomy articles created by Polbot